The blue-gray mouse (Pseudomys glaucus) is an Australian rodent species that is only known by a few specimens found in Eastern Australia, and since presumed to have become extinct.

Taxonomy 
The species was described by Oldfield Thomas in 1910. The number of specimens identified as Pseudomys glaucus is limited to three, two found in the northeastern state of Queensland and a single specimen collected to the south at Cryon in New South Wales.

Description 
A species of Pseudomys, these Australian rodents resembled the familiar house mouse (Mus musculus). The body of P. glaucus was robust with fine and dense fur, white at the underside and a pale blue-grey colour over the upperparts of the fur. The measurement of each of the three known specimens was 95 millimetres for the head and body combined, with a white-haired tail that was slightly longer (100 mm.) The weight range was 25 to 30 grams.

References

Pseudomys
Mammals described in 1910
Taxa named by Oldfield Thomas
Extinct rodents
Rodents of Australia